Oak Dell, also known as the Dr. Granville M. White House, is a historic mansion located at the corner of Franklin Street and Madison Avenue in the town of Morristown in Morris County, New Jersey. It is one of the few surviving mansions on "Millionaires Row" along Madison Avenue. Part of the Morristown Multiple Resource Area (MRA), it was listed on the National Register of Historic Places on November 13, 1986, for its significance in architecture.

History and description
The two and one-half story house was built in 1897 and features Colonial Revival architectural style. The large entry portico has a triangular pediment supported by Corinthian columns.  It was acquired by Grenville H. White of the Mutual Life Insurance Company of New York in 1910. White was also the president of the Morris County Golf Club. He sold the house in the 1950s.

See also
 National Register of Historic Places listings in Morris County, New Jersey

References

	
Morristown, New Jersey
National Register of Historic Places in Morris County, New Jersey
Colonial Revival architecture in New Jersey
Houses completed in 1897
Houses in Morris County, New Jersey
New Jersey Register of Historic Places